Daniel Rozin (born in 1961) is an Israeli-American artist working in the area of interactive digital art. As an interactive artist Rozin creates installations and sculptures that have the unique ability to change and respond to the presence and point of view of the viewer. In many cases the viewer becomes the contents of the piece and in others the viewer is invited to take an active role in the creation of the piece.

Biography

Rozin was born in Jerusalem in 1961. He studied industrial design at the Bezalel Academy in Jerusalem. Rozin lives and works in New York City.

Rust Mirror 
"Rust Mirror" is the eighth piece in a series of works that Rozin has created since 1999 called ‘mechanical mirrors’. In this series Rozin creates large-scale displays that recreate the viewer’s reflection by means of the manipulation of a multitude of tiles in a variety of materials, in effect turning these into physical pixels. Rust Mirror creates the viewer’s image by tilting tiles of rusted steel up and down in relation to a light source above the piece. As a person interacts with the piece, a trickle of ‘rain’ starts to flow onto the piece in the form of sequences of moving tiles. The more the person interacts with the piece the more it rains, until finally the storm of rain droplets completely overcomes the image of the viewer, accompanied by a loud rumble of rain produced by the motors and tiles. When the viewer steps out, the piece gradually settles down and returns to a still state. Rusted steel is one of the least reflective of materials, and also a material that suggests outdoor dilapidation rather than precise digital accuracy and control. The piece is presented on a bed of gravel that produces a crunching sound as the viewer interacts with the piece and emphasizes the outdoor/architectural style that the piece implies. To interact with the piece, stand in front of it at a distance of a few meters, see yourself reflected on its surface, note that the more you move in front of the piece the more it ‘rains’, move closer to the piece to get a more ‘zoomed-in’ image of your reflection.

Awards

His work has earned him numerous awards including:

 Honorary Mentions, Prix Ars Electronica
 ID Design Review
 Chrysler Design Award

Solo exhibitions

 2018 "MIRROR MIRROR" - Arts Brookfield NY 
 2015 "South Dakota" - Angostura Dam (U.S.)
 2013 "Angles" - Bitforms gallery NY 
 2012 "Mirrors" - Universidad Veritas San Jose, Costa Rica
 2011 "Daniel Rozin" - Museum of the Moving Image NY
 2010 "Contrast" - Chrysler Museum Norfolk VA
 2010 X by Y - Bitforms gallery NY 
 2009 "Reflections" - Exploratorium SF
 2007 "Fabrication" - Bitforms gallery NY 
 2006 "Daniel Rozin" - Bitforms gallery, Seoul Korea
 2005 “New Work” at Bitforms gallery NY
 2004 “Mirror image” - John Michael Kohler Art Center WI
 2003 “Mirrors” - Liquid Space, Israel Museum, Jerusalem
 2002 “Mirrors” - Bitforms gallery NY

Group exhibitions

 Ars Electronica 2017, Berlin
 2012 I/O/I. The senses of machines (Interaction Laboratory) Disseny Hub Barcelona
2010 ARCO Madrid Feb.
2010 ArchiTECHtonica, CU Art Museum Bouder CO Sep 9 - Dec 18
2010 TV of Tomorrow show, Yerba Buena, SF March
2010 What We See, Peabody Essex Museum, Salem, MA
2009 Victoria and Albert Museum London - Decode, Dec1 -Apr 11
2009 5MinutesMuseum, Dutch Design Week Eindhoven NL Oct 17 - 25
2009 Beyond Appearances Lehman Gallery New York Sep10 - Dec 1
2009 Dvorak Sec Contemporary, Prague
2009 Papalote Museo del Nino, Mexico City
2009 Pulse New York, March 5–9
2009 Taubman Museum inaugural show, Roanoke VA- November 8- February 9
2009 "Act/React" Milwaukee Art Museum - October 8 - January 9
2008 "Souls and Machines" Reina Sofia Museum Madrid - June
2008 "Sundance Film Festival at BAM" -June
2008 "Displacement" at CPR Brooklyn NY -March
2008 "New Frontier On Main", Sundance festival - January
2007 "Chapter 2 " Think 21 gallery Brussels, Belgium - December
2007 Pulse Contemporary Art Fair Miami - December
2007 "Make Art" Owens College OH
2006 TimeScan at Daelim Contemporary Art Museum Seoul
2006 Circles Mirror at Wired NextFest, New York
2006 Software Mirrors Itaú Cultural Institute, São Paulo, Brazil. Emoção Art.ficial 3.0
2006 Circles Mirror at ArtRock, France
2005 Wooden Mirror at MUSAC, Spain
2005 Trash Mirror at Taiwan National Museum of Fine Arts
2005 Live Pictures at Jamaica Center for Arts. NY
2005 ARCO Madrid Spain
2005 “Mosaics” exhibition at “Zman Laomanut” Tel Aviv Israel
2003 "Ars Electronica" - Trash Mirror . Linz Austria
2003 Group exhibition “Body Double” at Art Interactive Cambridge MA .
2002 American Museum of Moving Image - “Trash Mirror” in lobby.
2001 Inaugural exhibition, Markle Foundation Rockefeller Center New York
2000 "New Media New Face - New York" April 2000 ICC Tokyo Japan.
2000 "SIGGRAPH" July 2000 Siggraph art gallery New Orleans.
2000 "Media_City Seoul 2000" September 2000 Seoul, Korea.
2000 Tisch School of the Arts 35 Anniversary Gala December 2000 Lincoln Center
1999 "Interaction-99" March 1999 Ogaki City, Japan.
1999 "Ars Electronica" September 1999 Linz, Austria (Honorary mention).
1999 "More and Less" October 1999 ITP New York University New York.
1997 "Elsewhere" February 1997 SOHO Threadwaxing gallery, New York.

Performance
2007-2008 "Mirrors" Eighth Blackbird ensemble, composer Tamar Muskal

Sources

External links
 Official web site

American artists
Living people
1961 births
Tisch School of the Arts faculty
Israeli emigrants to the United States